Christiane de Souza Yared (born 23 February 1960) more commonly known as Christiane Yared is a Brazilian politician. She has spent her political career representing Paraná, having served as state representative since 2015.

Personal life
Yared is the daughter of Althair Costa Souza and Sulamite Souza. Yared is married to Gilmar Yared (now divorced) and has three children: Gilmar Jr., Jonathan, and Daniele. Gilmar Jr. than 26, and the driver of his honda, Carlos Murilo de Almeida, age 20, were killed in a car crash in May 2009 caused by politician Fernando Ribas Carli Filho in a separate vehicle. As a result of her son's death Yared has campaigned for traffic safety.

Aside from being a politician Verde has worked as a professor and businesswoman. Yared is an evangelical pastor of the Pentecostal church Catedral do Reino de Deus in Curitiba, along with her mother who is also a pastor at the church.

Political career
Yared was elected to the federal senate of deputies in the 2014 election receiving 200,144 votes and being in the top five most voted candidates from the state of Paraná.

Yared voted in favor of the impeachment of then-president Dilma Rousseff. Yared voted against the 2017 Brazilian labor reform, and would vote in favor of a corruption investigation into Rousseff's successor Michel Temer.

References

1960 births
Living people
Brazilian educators
Brazilian businesspeople
Brazilian Pentecostal pastors
Members of the Chamber of Deputies (Brazil) from Paraná
Politicians from Curitiba
Liberal Party (Brazil, 2006) politicians
21st-century Brazilian women politicians